Dalai may refer to:
 Dalai Lama
 Dalai nuur, a lake in Inner Mongolia, China
 Dalai (Tanzanian ward), a region in Tanzania
Dalai, Dali, unit of measure